The 2009–10 Boston College Eagles men's ice hockey season was the 88th season of play for the program and 26th in the Hockey East. They represented Boston College in the 2009–10 NCAA Division I men's ice hockey season. They were coached by Jerry York, in his 16th season and played their home games at the Conte Forum. The team won the 2010 NCAA Division I men's ice hockey tournament, the 4th title in program history.

Season
Boston College defeated Wisconsin 5–0 in the 2010 Frozen Four championship game, earning the school's fourth national championship and second title in three years. The Eagles defeated Alaska and Yale in the Northeast Regional in Worcester, earning them a berth in the Frozen Four to be played at Ford Field in Detroit. BC defeated Miami (OH) 7–1 in the national semifinal, the fourth time in five years that the Eagles ended the RedHawks' season in the NCAA tournament, before meeting Wisconsin in the final. The game was played before a record crowd of 37,592, the largest to attend an indoor hockey game. The 5–0 win in the national championship game was also Jerry York's 850th career victory.

After finishing second behind New Hampshire in the 2009–2010 Hockey East Regular Season, the Eagles won the 2010 Hockey East Tournament, defeating Maine 7–6 in overtime in the championship game, gaining their record ninth league title. BC also won the 2010 Beanpot Tournament, defeating rivals Boston University 4–3 in the final game to earn their fifteenth championship.

On January 8, 2010, Boston College and Boston University faced off at Fenway Park in the first men's college hockey game played at the home of the Boston Red Sox. BU edged BC 3–2 before a sellout crowd of 38,472.

Recruiting 
Boston College added nine freshmen for the 2009–10 season, including four defensemen, four forwards, and one goalie.

Departures
 Anthony Aiello, D – Graduation
 Tim Filangieri, D – Graduation
 Tim Kunes, D – Graduation
 Kyle Kucharski, F – Graduation
 Brock Bradford, F – Graduation
 Benn Ferriero, F – Graduation
 Andrew Orpik, F – Graduation
 Alex Kremer, G – left team
 Nick Petrecki, D – signed with SJS

Roster

Standings

Schedule and results

|-
!colspan=12 ! style=""; | Exhibition

|-
!colspan=12 ! style=""; | Regular Season

|-
!colspan=12 ! style=""; | 

|-
!colspan=12 ! style=""; | 

|-
!colspan=12 style=";" | 

|-
!colspan=12 style=";" |

National Championship game

Scoring statistics

Goaltending statistics

^ Muse and Venti shared a shutout on February 1, Milner and Venti shared a shutout on February 23.

Rankings

Note: USCHO did not release a poll in weeks 11, 24, or 25.

Awards and honors

Players drafted into the NHL

2010 NHL Entry Draft

† incoming freshman

References

External links 
 BC Men's Hockey Home Page
 BC Men's Hockey Page on USCHO

2009–10
Boston College Eagles
Boston College Eagles
Boston College
Boston College
Boston College Eagles men's ice hockey season
Boston College Eagles men's ice hockey season
Boston College Eagles men's ice hockey season
Boston College Eagles men's ice hockey season